Walter Schmidinger (28 April 1933 – 28 September 2013) was an Austrian actor.

Schmidinger was born in Linz, and died, aged 80, in Berlin.

Filmography

References

External links

Short Biography 

1933 births
2013 deaths
Austrian male television actors